Bill Crane (11 January 1924 – 2 October 2014) was an Australian rules footballer who played with Collingwood in the Victorian Football League (VFL). Before playing for the VFL Magpies, Crane played for Abbotsford and came with Des Fothergill to Williamstown in the VFA in 1941 as a 17yo and made two appearances for the Seagulls without kicking a goal before the recess for the Second World War intervened in his career. He went to Footscray in 1942 but failed to play a senior game before arriving at Collingwood in 1943.

Notes

External links 

		

1924 births
2014 deaths
Australian rules footballers from Victoria (Australia)
Collingwood Football Club players
Williamstown Football Club players